Harpalus desertus is a species of ground beetle in the subfamily Harpalinae. It was described by John Lawrence LeConte in 1859.

References

desertus
Beetles described in 1859